Warner Bros. World may refer to:

Warner Bros. World Abu Dhabi
Warner Bros. Movie World
Parque Warner Madrid, formerly known as Warner Bros. Movie World Madrid